Orthopodomyia is a genus of mosquitoes in the family Culicidae. There are at least 40 described species in Orthopodomyia.

Species
These 40 species belong to the genus Orthopodomyia:

 Orthopodomyia alba Baker, 1936
 Orthopodomyia albicosta (Lutz, 1904)
 Orthopodomyia albionensis MacGregor, 1919
 Orthopodomyia albipes (Giles, 1904)
 Orthopodomyia ambremontis Brunhes & Hervy, 1995
 Orthopodomyia andamanensis Barraud, 1934
 Orthopodomyia ankaratrensis Brunhes & Hervy, 1995
 Orthopodomyia anopheloides (Giles, 1903)
 Orthopodomyia antanosyorum Rodhain & Boutonnier, 1984
 Orthopodomyia arboricollis (Charmoy, 1908)
 Orthopodomyia aureoantennata Ferrara, 1973
 Orthopodomyia comorensis Brunhes, 1977
 Orthopodomyia fascipes (Coquillett, 1906)
 Orthopodomyia flavicosta (Barraud, 1927)
 Orthopodomyia flavithorax (Barraud, 1927)
 Orthopodomyia fontenillei Brunhes & Hervy, 1995
 Orthopodomyia geberti Grjebine, 1953
 Orthopodomyia joyoni Brunhes, 1977
 Orthopodomyia kummi Edwards, 1939
 Orthopodomyia lanyuensis Lien, 1968
 Orthopodomyia madecassorum Rodhain & Boutonnier, 1984
 Orthopodomyia madrensis Baisas, 1946
 Orthopodomyia mcgregori (Banks, 1909)
 Orthopodomyia milloti Doucet, 1951
 Orthopodomyia nkolbissonensis Rickenback & Hamon, 1965
 Orthopodomyia papuensis Zavortink, 1968
 Orthopodomyia peytoni Leguizamon & Carpintero, 2004
 Orthopodomyia phyllozoa (Dyar & Knab, 1907)
 Orthopodomyia pulcripalpis (Rondani, 1872)
 Orthopodomyia rajaonariveloi Brunhes & Hervy, 1995
 Orthopodomyia ravaonjanaharyi Brunhes & Hervy, 1995
 Orthopodomyia reunionensis Brunhes & Hervy, 1995
 Orthopodomyia rodhaini Brunhes & Hervy, 1995
 Orthopodomyia sampaioi Lima, 1935
 Orthopodomyia siamensis Zavortink, 1968
 Orthopodomyia signifera (Coquillett, 1896)
 Orthopodomyia vernoni Someren, 1949
 Orthopodomyia wanxianensis Lei, 1991
 Orthopodomyia waverleyi (Grabham, 1907)
 Orthopodomyia wilsoni Macdonald, 1958

References

Further reading

 
 
 
 

 
Culicidae
Articles created by Qbugbot